Frank J. Gargiulo (born May 18, 1939) is an American Republican Party politician who served in the New Jersey General Assembly from the 32nd Legislative District from 1986 to 1988.

References

1939 births
Living people
Republican Party members of the New Jersey General Assembly
Politicians from Jersey City, New Jersey